Football has been part of the Southeast Asian Games sport since the 1959 edition. The women's football competition was held for the first time in 1985 in Thailand.

From the 2001 Southeast Asian Games to the 2015 Southeast Asian Games, the age limit for men's teams was under-23 plus up to three over-aged players for each squad.

Since the 2017 Southeast Asian Games, the age limit for men's teams is under-22. At the 2019 Southeast Asian Games, two over-aged players were allowed for each team.

Thailand and Vietnam are the only two nations have won both Gold medals of Men's and Women's tournament in a Southeast Asian Games.

Results

Men's tournament

Southeast Asian Peninsular Games 

1 Decided by round-robin standings.
2 The title was shared.
3 There was no bronze medal game held.

Southeast Asian Games 

4 Indonesia did not turn up at the appointed time. After waiting for 15 minutes the referee called off the game and reported to the technical committee which awarded the bronze to Burma.
5 Decided by round-robin standings.

Women's tournament

Southeast Asian Games

Medal tally

Men's tournament

Women's tournament

All tournaments

Top goalscorer

Men

Women

Winning managers

Men

Women

See also
 AFF Championship
 AFF Women's Championship
 AFF U-23 Championship
 Football at the East Asian Games
 Football at the West Asian Games
 Football at the Asian Games

References

External links
 
 
 

 
Southeast Asian Games